Fakhraddin Manaf oglu Manafov (born 2 August 1955, in Khankendi, Nagorno-Karabakh, NKAO, Soviet Azerbaijan) is an Azerbaijani actor.

Biography 
He was born in Khankendi, Nagorno-Karabakh. His family moved to Baku when he was around 5. He made his first movie appearance in 1978. In 1980, Manafov graduated from the Azerbaijan State University of Culture and Arts and started working with Azerbaijanfilm. 
 1975–1980 - studied at the Azerbaijan State Institute of Arts. M. A. Aliyeva.
 1971–1974 - worked as a projectionist in the House of actors. A. M. Sharifzadeh.
 1976–1978 - actor in the educational theater.
 1989–1993 - actor in the State Theater "South".

Since 1978 he has been shooting in the films of the film studio "Azerbaijanfilm" Jafar Jabbarly. He was also filmed in the film studio Uzbekfilm and in Russia. Also engaged in scoring. For the role of Ibrahim Khalil Khan in the film "The Fate of the Emperor" was awarded the "Zirvia" award (rus: peak). From the interview of Fakhraddin Manafov to the Zerkalo newspaper:

On his childhood he wrote:

About acting he said:

In 2000 he was awarded the title of People's Artist of Azerbaijan. Since 2006, he has been a presidential retiree. On April 24, 2016 Fahraddin Manafov made his debut on the stage of the Azerbaijan State Russian Drama Theater named after Samed Vurgun in Baku, playing in the play "Casanova: Lessons of Love".

Notable filmography
Business Visit (1982)
Park (1983)
Window of Grief (1986)
Another Life (1987)
Forgive Me If I Die (1989)
Murder in the Night Train (1990)
Seven Days after the Murder (1991)
Tahmina (1993)
Hotel Room (1998)
Drongo (2002)
Try Not to Breathe (2006)
A Sovereign's Destiny (2008)
Mahmud and Maryam (2013)
Ali and Nino (2016)

References

External links

 An Interview with Fakhraddin Manafov 
 

Azerbaijani male film actors
1955 births
Living people
People's Artists of Azerbaijan
Soviet Azerbaijani people
20th-century Azerbaijani male actors
21st-century Azerbaijani male actors
People from Stepanakert